Edward Webster Bush (July 11, 1918 — May 31, 1984) was a Canadian ice hockey defenceman and coach. He played 26 games in the National Hockey League (NHL) with the Detroit Red Wings between 1939 and 1942. The rest of his career, which lasted from 1938 to 1951, was spent in various minor leagues. He later became a coach, spending several years in the junior Ontario Hockey Association, finishing by coaching the Kansas City Scouts of the NHL for 32 games during their second and final season in 1975–76.

Career
Bush began his career by playing junior hockey in Guelph, Ontario. He then became a hockey vagabond, playing on fourteen separate squads over thirteen years as a professional. He played 26 games over parts of two seasons in the National Hockey League for the Detroit Red Wings, but spent most of his career in the American Hockey League Bush also saw his career interrupted by military service, as he took off the entire 1945-46 campaign to serve in the Royal Canadian Air Force. Bush's five-point Game 3 in the 1942 Stanley Cup Finals remains the record for defensemen in a championship round game.

In 1950, Bush began his long coaching career by presiding over his hometown junior club, the Collingwood Shipbuilders. He later led a variety of other teams, including the Guelph Biltmores , Kitchener Rangers and Hamilton Red Wings (  he coached  Hamilton to a 1962 Memorial Cup victory) of junior hockey, and the Quebec Aces and Richmond Robins of the AHL. He took a job as a scout with the fledgling Kansas City Scouts, and he served as interim coach for 32 games in 1976.

Career statistics

Regular season and playoffs

Coaching record

References

External links

1918 births
1984 deaths
Canadian expatriate ice hockey players in the United States
Canadian ice hockey defencemen
Cincinnati Mohawks (AHL) players
Cleveland Barons (1937–1973) players
Detroit Red Wings players
Guelph Indians players
Ice hockey people from Simcoe County
Indianapolis Capitals players
Kansas City Greyhounds players
Kansas City Scouts coaches
Kitchener Rangers coaches
Louisville Blades players
Ontario Hockey Association Senior A League (1890–1979) players
Philadelphia Rockets players
Pittsburgh Hornets coaches
Providence Reds players
Quebec Aces coaches
Royal Canadian Air Force personnel of World War II
St. Louis Flyers players
Sherbrooke Saints players
Sportspeople from Collingwood, Ontario